Graphium kosii  is a species of butterfly found only on New Ireland in Papua New Guinea.

It may be the same species as Graphium weiskei.

References

Kosii
Butterflies of Oceania
Endemic fauna of Papua New Guinea
Lepidoptera of Papua New Guinea
New Ireland Province